Oita Miyoshi Weisse Adler is a men's volleyball team based in Oita City, Oita, Japan. It plays in V.League 1, the top tier of the Japanese volleyball league. It represented Japan at the 2014 Asian Men's Club Volleyball Championship.

Weisse Adler means "white eagles" in German.

History
Franchise was founded in 1994 by Miyoshi internal medicin - cardiology hospital. Many players of the team work for its own medical practice.
Franchise was promoted to V.Premier League in 2006.
Franchise to be demoted for losing V.Challenge match in April 2009. Demotion takes place the following season.

Honours
V.Premier League
Champion (0):
Runners-up (0):
All Japan Volleyball Championship
Champions (0):
Runners-up (0):
Emperor's Cup
Champion (0):

League results
 Champions   Runners-up

Current squad
The following is team roster of Season 2022-2023

{|class="wikitable sortable" style="font-size:100%; text-align:center;"
! colspan="7"| Team roster – Season 2022-2023|-
!No.
!style="width:12em"|Name
!style="width:7em"|Position
!style="width:14em"|Date of birth
!style="width:8em"|Height (m)
!style="width:7em"|Weight (kg)
!style="width:7em"|Spike (cm)
|-
|align=center|2
|align=left| Enock Some
|align=center|Opposite Hitter
|align=right|
|align=left|
|align=center|
|align=center|360
|-
|align=center|3
|align=left| Abe Ryota
|align=center|Outside Hitter
|align=right|
|align=left|
|align=center|
|align=center|345
|-
|align=center|4
|align=left| Kantapat Koonmee
|align=center|Outside Hitter
|align=right|
|align=left|
|align=center|
|align=center|355
|-
|align=center|5
|align=left| Motoyuki Onishi
|align=center|Middle Blocker
|align=right|
|align=left|
|align=center|
|align=center|335
|-
|align=center|6
|align=left| Ryusuke Nakamura
|align=center|Middle Blocker
|align=right|
|align=left|
|align=center|
|align=center|338
|-
|align=center|7
|align=left| Takemune Ogawa
|align=center|Libero
|align=right|
|align=left|
|align=center|
|align=center|315
|-
|align=center|8
|align=left| Kyogo Kawaguchi
|align=center|Middle Blocker
|align=right|
|align=left|
|align=center|
|align=center|335
|-
|align=center|10
|align=left| Kota Yamada
|align=center|Outside Hitter
|align=right|
|align=left|
|align=center|
|align=center|335
|-
|align=center|11
|align=left| Hiroki Ito
|align=center|Setter
|align=right|
|align=left|
|align=center|
|align=center|332
|-
|align=center|12
|align=left| Shohei Ono
|align=center|Outside Hitter
|align=right|
|align=left|
|align=center|
|align=center|330
|-
|align=center|13
|align=left| Masato Kubota
|align=center|Libero
|align=right|
|align=left|
|align=center|
|align=center|320
|-
|align=center|14
|align=left| Shota Fujiwara
|align=center|Outside Hitter
|align=right|
|align=left|
|align=center|
|align=center|330
|-
|align=center|15
|align=left| Shodai Abe
|align=center|Middle Blocker
|align=right|
|align=left|
|align=center|
|align=center|335
|-
|align=center|16
|align=left| Yutaka Hamamoto
|align=center|Outside Hitter
|align=right|
|align=left|
|align=center|
|align=center|335
|-
|align=center|18
|align=left| Kenta Koga
|align=center|Opposite Hitter
|align=right|
|align=left|
|align=center|
|align=center|335
|-
|align=center|20
|align=left| Toshiaki Nagao
|align=center|Outside Hitter
|align=right|
|align=left|
|align=center|
|align=center|330
|-
|align=center|21
|align=left| Naoki Inokuchi
|align=center|Setter
|align=right|
|align=left|
|align=center|
|align=center|315
|-
|align=center|22
|align=left| Kurama Fujioka
|align=center|Setter
|align=right|
|align=left|
|align=center|
|align=center|315
|-
|colspan=7| Head coach:  Murray Pole
|}

Notable playersForeign Players'''

 Marck Jesus Espejo (2018–2019)
 Bryan Bagunas (2019–2022)

 Kantapat Koonmee (2022–)

 Emerson Rodriguez (2021–2022)

References

Japanese volleyball teams
Volleyball clubs established in 1994
Sports teams in Ōita Prefecture